Douglas Arnold Preston (December 19, 1858 – October 20, 1929) was an American attorney and politician who served as the Attorney General of Wyoming as a member of the Democratic Party.

Early life
Douglas Arnold Preston was born in Olney, Illinois on December 19, 1858, to Finney D. Preston and Phoebe Mundy. In 1878 he was admitted to the legal bar and served in Illinois courts until 1887 when he moved to Cheyenne, Wyoming Territory. In 1887 he created an office in Rawlins with John R. Dixon and then moved to Lander in 1888 and in 1895 he moved to Rock Springs.

Career

From 1880 to 1884, he served as prosecuting attorney of Richland County, Illinois. In 1889, he was selected as one of the Democratic delegates to the Wyoming constitutional convention to draft its constitution to be submitted for statehood. From 1903 to 1905, he served in the state House of Representatives. In 1911, Governor Joseph M. Carey appointed him as attorney general and  he was later reappointed by Governor John B. Kendrick in 1915.

In 1928, he won election to the Wyoming Senate. On October 8, 1929, he was involved in a car crash which gave him four broken ribs and a severe skull fracture and on October 21, died in a Rock Springs hospital. In 1930, his widow, Anna Preston, was named as the Democratic nominee for Wyoming Superintendent of Public Instruction.

References

External links

1858 births
1929 deaths
People from Olney, Illinois
Illinois lawyers
Wyoming lawyers
19th-century American politicians
20th-century American politicians
Democratic Party Wyoming state senators
Democratic Party members of the Wyoming House of Representatives
Wyoming Attorneys General
Road incident deaths in Wyoming
19th-century American lawyers